Police Nurse is a 1963 American drama film directed by Maury Dexter and written by Harry Spalding. The film stars Ken Scott, Merry Anders, Oscar Beregi (Jr.), Barbara Mansell, John Holland and Byron Morrow. The film was released in May 1963, by 20th Century Fox.

Plot

Cast 
Ken Scott as Art Devlin
Merry Anders as Joan Olson
Oscar Beregi (Jr.) as Dr. Leon Claudel 
Barbara Mansell as Irene Kersey
John Holland as Edward Mayhall
Byron Morrow as Capt. Pete Ingersoll
Ivan Bonar as Dr. C. F. Sears
Jerry Murray as Terry
Justin Smith as Pharmacist
Carol Brewster as Mrs. Mayhall

Production
Dexter says the film's title was an idea of Robert L. Lippert who asked Spalding to write a story to suit it. Dexter later wrote "the only problem was... there never was a capacity for a nurse in the police department. We shot the film anyway."

Filming took place in January 1963.

References

External links 
 

Police Nurse at BFI

1964 films
20th Century Fox films
American drama films
1963 drama films
CinemaScope films
1963 films
Films directed by Maury Dexter
Films scored by Richard LaSalle
1964 drama films
1960s English-language films
1960s American films